Le Bois Travaille Même Le Dimanche is a Studio album by the French progressive rock band Ange. It was released in 2010.

Track listing
"Des Papillons, Des Cerfs Volants"  – 07:31
"Hors-La-Loi"  – 05:02
"Le Bois Travaille, Même Le Dimanche"  – 12:40
"Sous Le Nez De Pinocchio"  – 04:48
"Voyage En Autarcie"  – 07:05
"Jamais Seul"  – 03:30
"L'œil Et L'ouïe"  – 05:54
"Clown Blanc"  – 03:28
"Dames Et Dominos"  – 03:53
"Les Collines Roses"  – 03:51
"Ultime Atome (Anatomie D'un Conte À Rebours)"  – 03:51
"A L'ombre Des Pictogrammes"  – 06:27

Personnel
Vocals, Acoustic Guitar, Keyboards, Sequences, Accordion: Christian Decamps
Vocals: Caroline Crozat
Keyboards, Guitar, Sequences, Backing Vocals: Tristan Decamps
Guitar, Backing Vocals: Hassan Hajdi
Bass, Backing Vocals: Thierry Sidhoum
Drums, Percussion: Benoît Cazzulini
Producer, mixing: Laurent Lepagneau

References
Le Bois Travaille Même Le Dimanche on ange-updlm 
Le Bois Travaille Même Le Dimanche on www.discogs.com

Ange albums
2010 live albums